The Process of Weeding Out is the fifth EP by American band Black Flag. One of the most potent realizations of guitarist Greg Ginn's fascination with the avant-garde, The Process of Weeding Out is described by critic Chris True of AllMusic as "an interesting document of Greg Ginn's development from high-speed guitar 'sculptor' to one of the few punk artists to embrace 12-tone experimental music." Robert Palmer of The New York Times described the album as "what jazz-rock could have become if the best of the musicians who first crossbred jazz improvising with rock's sonic fire power had followed their most creative impulses." Because of the jazz influences by Ginn, all of the tracks are instrumental.

The back cover has a quote from Ginn, reading, in part:
"...even though this record may communicate certain feelings, emotions, and ideas to some, I have faith that cop-types with their strictly linear minds and stick-to-the-rules mentality don't have the ability to decipher the intuitive contents of this record."

Track listing
All songs by Greg Ginn, except where noted.

Side one
"Your Last Affront" – 9:39
"Screw the Law" – 2:24

Side two
"The Process of Weeding Out" – 9:58
"Southern Rise" (Ginn/Kira Roessler/Bill Stevenson) – 5:00

Personnel
Greg Ginn – guitar
Kira Roessler – bass guitar
Bill Stevenson – drums
Raymond Pettibon – cover art

References

Black Flag (band) EPs
1985 EPs
SST Records EPs
Albums produced by Bill Stevenson (musician)